Karl Becker (September 20, 1923 – May 3, 2002) was a German politician of the Christian Democratic Union (CDU) and former member of the German Bundestag.

Life 
Becker had been a member of the CDU since 1969. In the 1976 federal elections, he was elected to the German Bundestag via the Frankfurt am Main II constituency, of which he was a member until 1980. From 13 September 1982, when he succeeded Hans-Joachim Jentsch, he was again a member of the Bundestag until 1990. From 1983 to 1990 he again represented the constituency of Frankfurt II in parliament.

Literature

References

1923 births
2002 deaths
Members of the Bundestag for Hesse
Members of the Bundestag 1987–1990
Members of the Bundestag 1983–1987
Members of the Bundestag 1980–1983
Members of the Bundestag 1976–1980
Members of the Bundestag for the Christian Democratic Union of Germany